The 1909 Rose Polytechnic football team represented the Rose Polytechnic Institute during the 1909 college football season.  Under Coach Clarke, Rose Poly compiled a 4–4 record, and played a tough schedule that included Vanderbilt, Notre Dame, Kentucky, and Purdue.  Against Notre Dame, Rose Poly was crushed 60 to 11, but managed to score the first touchdown against the Fighting Irish in two years.

Schedule

References

Rose Polytechnic
Rose–Hulman Fightin' Engineers football seasons
Rose Polytechnic football